The 1941-42 Bohemian-Moravian Hockey League season was the third season of the Bohemian-Moravian Hockey League. Six teams participated in the league, and LTC Prag won the championship.

Regular season

Promotion
Semifinals:
 SK Podolí Prag – CASK Písek 2:1 n.V.
 AFK Kolín – SK Viktoria Uherský Ostroh 2:4

Final:
 SK Podolí Prag – SK Viktoria Uherský Ostroh 3:0

SK Podoli Prag was promoted to the Bohemian-Moravian League for 1942–43.

External links
 Season on hockeyarchives.info

Bohemian-Moravian Hockey League seasons
Boh